Oakeley may refer to:

People
 Atholl Oakeley (1900–1987), heavyweight boxer
 Sir Charles Oakeley, 1st Baronet (1751–1826), Governor of Madras
 Frederick Oakeley (1802–1880), translated Adeste Fideles (Oh Come All Ye Faithful) into English
 W. E. Oakeley (1828–1912), owner of the Oakeley Quarry
 Richard Bagnall-Oakeley (born 1865), Welsh Olympic archer
 Hugh Oakeley Arnold-Forster (1855–1909), British politician
 Oakeley Baronets, of Shrewsbury

Places 

 Oakeley Quarry, Blaenau Ffestiniog

See also
Oakley (disambiguation)
Oakleigh (disambiguation)

Surnames